Álvaro Escobar (born 16 May 1955) is a Colombian former footballer. He played in ten matches for the Colombia national football team from 1983 to 1985. He was also part of Colombia's squad for the 1983 Copa América tournament.

References

External links
 

1955 births
Living people
Colombian footballers
Colombia international footballers
Association football defenders
Independiente Medellín footballers
Deportes Tolima footballers
Deportivo Cali footballers
Footballers from Medellín
Deportivo Pereira managers
Deportes Tolima managers